Tasovice is a municipality and village in Znojmo District in the South Moravian Region of the Czech Republic. It has about 1,400 inhabitants.

Notable people
Johann Jahn (1750–1816), German orientalist
Clement Mary Hofbauer (1751–1820), hermit and priest of the Redemptorist congregation
Matouš Trmal (born 1998), footballer

References

Villages in Znojmo District